This page shows the results of the Men's Judo Competition at the 1979 Pan American Games, held from July 1 to July 15, 1979 in San Juan, Puerto Rico. There were a total number of eight weight divisions, and just men competing.

Medal table

Men's competition

Men's Bantamweight (-60 kg)

Men's Featherweight (-65 kg)

Men's Lightweight (-71 kg)

Men's Light Middleweight (-78 kg)

Men's Middleweight (-86 kg)

Men's Light Heavyweight (-95 kg)

Men's Heavyweight (+95 kg)

Men's Open

References

1979 Pan American Games
American Games
1979
Judo competitions in Puerto Rico
International sports competitions hosted by Puerto Rico